Dudek is a Slavic surname.

Dudek may also refer to:
Dudek, Iran (disambiguation), several places in Iran
 DUDEK, a Polish encryption device
Dudek Paragliding, a Polish aircraft manufacturer
Dudek V-1 Sportplane